Lake Burgan is a lake in Douglas County, in the U.S. state of Minnesota.

Lake Burgan was named for William P. Burgan, a pioneer who settled at the lake in 1869.

See also
List of lakes in Minnesota

References

Lakes of Minnesota
Lakes of Douglas County, Minnesota